Licus Vallis is an ancient river valley in the Mare Tyrrhenum quadrangle of Mars, located at .

References

See also

 Geology of Mars
 HiRISE
 Vallis (planetary geology)
 Water on Mars

Valleys and canyons on Mars
Mare Tyrrhenum quadrangle